Aregawi is a surname. Notable people with the surname include:

Abeba Aregawi (born 1990), Ethiopian-born Swedish middle-distance runner
Abuna Aregawi, Ethiopian saint
Amare Aregawi, Ethiopian journalist
Sebhat Aregawi (?–1914), Ethiopian Ras

Surnames of African origin